Mountain City is a small census-designated place in Elko County, Nevada, United States, within the Mountain City Ranger District of the Humboldt-Toiyabe National Forest.

Demographics

History
A post office was established at Mountain City in 1870.  The community was descriptively named on account of the natural surroundings of its elevated town site.

Due to its small size, Mountain City is classified by some writers as a ghost town.

Time zone
Mountain City, along with the rest of Nevada except for the city of West Wendover, is legally in the Pacific Time Zone, but, along with other Idaho border towns such as Jackpot, Jarbidge and Owyhee, unofficially observes the Mountain Time Zone due to closer proximity to and greater connections with towns in southern Idaho.

Climate
Mountain City sees a humid continental climate (Koppen: Dfb) with four seasons and generally not a large amount of year-round precipitation. Due to its high elevation the area sees very cold nights - even in summer, with frost possible in every month. Winters are bitterly cold at night.

References

External links

Census-designated places in Elko County, Nevada
Census-designated places in Nevada
Elko, Nevada micropolitan area